Eucoenogenes teliferana is a species of moth of the family Tortricidae. It is found in China (Jilin), Korea, Japan and Russia.

The wingspan is 13-14.5 mm.

The larvae feed on Corylus mandshurica.

References

Moths described in 1882
Teliferana